Aaron Wess Mitchell (born April 1, 1977) is an American foreign policy expert and former diplomat who was the Assistant Secretary of State for European and Eurasian Affairs from October 2017 until February 2019. Prior to assuming the role at State Department, he was president and CEO of the Center for European Policy Analysis. On July 19, 2017, President Donald Trump nominated Mitchell as Assistant Secretary of State for European and Eurasian Affairs.

He was unanimously confirmed by the United States Senate in September 2017. On January 22, 2019, it was announced Mitchell would resign from his post in February.

Early life
Aaron Wess Mitchell is a sixth generation Texan who was born in Lubbock, Texas in 1977. He received his B.A. in history from Texas Tech University. He received his M.A. in German and European studies from the BMW Center for German and European Studies at the Georgetown University School of Foreign Service. While studying there, he was awarded the 2004 Hopper Award. He received his DPhil in Political Science from the Otto-Suhr-Institut für Politikwissenschaft from the Freie Universität Berlin.

Career
Mitchell co-founded the Center for European Policy Analysis in 2005 at the age of twenty-eight. CEPA is a non-profit, non-partisan public policy research institute that studies Central and Eastern Europe. Before co-founding CEPA, Mitchell was a research associate at the National Center for Policy Analysis. At CEPA, the bulk of Mitchell's reports and articles advanced the argument that the United States should increase its diplomatic and military engagement with allies in Central and Eastern Europe and East Asia that could otherwise fall under Russian or Chinese influence. Mitchell was among the earliest proponents of placing U.S. and NATO military personnel in Poland and the Baltic States in the aftermath of the 2008 Russo-Georgia War. He was a critic of the Obama Administration's U.S.-Russia Reset. In November 2008 he wrote that "Moscow could precipitate a major crisis in Ukraine within [the Obama administration’s] first two years in office." In 2009 he wrote: "Signs of [U.S.] retreat...  regional democrats and embolden Moscow to push its luck elsewhere, particularly in Ukraine." Mitchell was an early proponent of using deterrence-by-denial to defend vulnerable U.S. allies like Estonia or Taiwan from Russian or Chinese attack. Where deterrence-by-punishment seeks to dissuade aggression by threatening retaliation against the attacker, deterrence-by-denial seeks to dissuade aggression by making the object of attack itself more resistant to attack.

In his historical writing, Mitchell has focused mainly on the Habsburg Empire. In his 2018 book The Grand Strategy of the Habsburg Empire, Mitchell argued that Austria successfully managed over-extended frontiers against numerous stronger rivals by employing strategies of time-management that allowed it to sequence military contests and avoid contests of strength beyond its ability to bear. An article in The Wall Street Journal about the Habsburg Empire that Mitchell co-authored with Purdue University historian Charles Ingrao received the Stanton Prize for using applied history to illuminate contemporary challenges.

In 2012, Mitchell was an adviser to the national security transition team for the Mitt Romney presidential campaign.

Mitchell is the author of three books, The Grand Strategy of the Habsburg Empire (Princeton University Press, 2018), The Unquiet Frontier: Vulnerable Allies, Rising Rivals and the Crisis of American Power with Jakub J. Grygiel (Princeton University Press, 2016) and The Godfather Doctrine: A Foreign Policy Parable with John Hulsman (Princeton University Press, 2009).

Mitchell and Grygiel's 2016 book Unquiet Frontier has been cited as having had a significant influence on National Security Advisor General H.R. McMaster's formulation of the 2017 U.S. National Security Strategy and the shift of emphasis in U.S. foreign policy to great-power competition. The book argues that rising and revisionist powers, Russia and China, are "probing" the periphery of the U.S.-led international order by placing pressure on U.S. allies, and that the United States should strengthen its alliances as a way of achieving strategic stability.

As Assistant Secretary for European and Eurasian Affairs, Mitchell was responsible for diplomatic relations with the 50 countries of Europe and Eurasia, as well as the institutions of NATO, the EU, and OSCE. He was seen as an advocate for strengthening NATO, for providing military assistance to Ukraine and Georgia, and for stepping up U.S. efforts to counter Russia and China. In August 2018 testimony to the U.S. Senate Committee on Foreign Relations, Mitchell stated:

"Russia and China are serious competitors that are building up the material and ideological wherewithal to contest U.S. primacy and leadership in the 21st Century. It continues to be among the foremost national security interests of the United States to prevent the domination of the Eurasian landmass by hostile powers."

Mitchell was seen as an architect of State Department efforts to increase U.S. engagement with states in East-Central Europe, the Caucasus, and Western Balkans as a means of countering Russian and Chinese geopolitical influence. Mitchell was also seen as a driver of greater U.S. involvement in the Eastern Mediterranean, including through the deepening of U.S. ties with Greece, Cyprus and Israel.

He played a role in the resolution of the Greece-North Macedonia name dispute that created the possibility for North Macedonia to join NATO.

In a January 4, 2019 letter to Secretary of State Mike Pompeo, Mitchell stated personal and professional reasons for his decision to resign from his post. In an interview, he said he had not taken this decision in a protest at the Trump administration's policies. Mitchell's resignation, which became publicly known on January 22, became effective in February 2019.

Mitchell currently serves as Vice Chairman of the Center for European Policy Analysis, as Senior Advisor at the Office of Strategic Stability and Security at the United States Institute of Peace, as a Non-Resident Fellow in the Applied History Project at Harvard University's John F. Kennedy School of Government, and as a member of the international advisory board for Cambridge University's Centre for Geopolitics. He previously served as a Chair of the Europe Group for the John Hay Initiative, and as a member of the advisory councils of the Richard G. Lugar Institute for Diplomacy and Congress, the Slovak Atlantic Commission, the Prague Center for Transatlantic Relations, the Atlantic Initiative, and the Alexander Hamilton Society.

In 2019 Mitchell co-founded with Elbridge A. Colby The Marathon Initiative, a 501c3 think-tank that studies great-power competition. Mitchell’s work at The Marathon Initiative focuses on the intersection of history, diplomacy and strategy; his writing has used the experiences of historical empires, including Byzantium, Venice, the Habsburg Monarchy, and the British Empire, to understand the problem of two-front war in strategy, as a way of examining America’s strategic options for dealing with Russia and China. Mitchell is a life member of the Council on Foreign Relations.

On March 31, 2020, NATO Secretary General Jens Stoltenberg appointed Mitchell co-chair of NATO's high-level Reflection Group, a commission of senior experts tasked with providing recommendations to the Secretary General for strengthening the political cohesion and decision-making of the Alliance. The Reflection Group submitted the final report to the Secretary General on November 25, 2020.

Personal life
He lives in Virginia with his wife and two children. He speaks German.

Publications
 The Grand Strategy of the Habsburg Empire. Princeton University Press. 2018. 
 Unquiet Frontier: Rising Rivals, Vulnerable Allies, and the Crisis of American Power. Princeton University Press. 2016. 
 The Godfather Doctrine. Princeton University Press. 2006.

Honors
 Officer's Cross of the Order of Merit, Republic of Poland
 Commander's Cross of the Order of Merit, Hungary
 Gold Medal of the Ministry of Foreign Affairs, Slovak Republic
 Hopper Award, Center for German and European Studies, Georgetown University
 Distinguished Alumni Award, Texas Tech University
 Stanton Prize for Applied History, Stanton Foundation

References

External links

 Biography at the Center for European Policy Analysis

1977 births
Living people
Texas Tech University alumni
Walsh School of Foreign Service alumni
Free University of Berlin alumni
Trump administration personnel
United States Assistant Secretaries of State